L Version 3.1 is a live album by Moe that was recorded at several shows from their fall 1999 tour. Former drummer Jim Loughlin returned to the band earlier in the year as a multi-instrumental utility man, adding to the drum work of Vinnie Amico.

Unlike L, L Version 3.1 was only available through the band's web site or at shows.

Track listing
 Moth
 Hi & Lo ->
 Brent Black

All three tracks were recorded on 26 November 1999.

External links
 Moe official website

Moe (band) live albums
2000 live albums